This is a list of waterfalls in South Korea.

List of waterfalls of South Korea

Jeju Special Self-Governing Province
This is a list of waterfalls in Jeju Special Self-Governing Province():
 Cheonjiyeon Waterfall
 Jeongbang Waterfall
 Cheonjeyeon Waterfall
 Ungtto Waterfall

Gangwon-do
This is a list of waterfalls in Gangwon-do:
 Gugok Waterfall
 Sambuyeon Waterfall
 Jicktang Waterfall
 Deungsun Waterfall
 Daeseung Waterfall
 Chikso Waterfall
 Miin Waterfall
 Yongchu Waterfall
 Garyeong Waterfall
 Biryong Waterfall
 Chundang Waterfall
 Pallang Waterfall
 Maewoldae Waterfall
 Gusung Waterfall
 Towangseong Waterfall
 Ssang Waterfall
 Guryeong Waterfall
 Jikyeon Waterfall
 Owryeon Waterfall
 Yukdam Waterfall
 Yang Waterfall
 Eum Waterfall

Gyeonggi-do
This is a list of waterfalls in Gyeonggi-do
 Piano Waterfall
 Jaein Waterfall
 Youngso Waterfall
 Ungae Waterfall
 Jungwon Waterfall
 Youngchu Waterfall
 Mujuchae Waterfall
 Mujigae Waterfall
 Myungji Waterfall
 Bokhodong Waterfall
 Baeknyun Waterfall
 Muu Waterfall

Gyeongsangbuk-do
This is a list of waterfalls in Gyeongsangbuk-do
 Janggak Waterfall
 Sangseng Waterfall
 Huibang Waterfall
 Bongnae Waterfall
 Yongchu Waterfall
 Osong Waterfall
 Dalgwi Waterfall

Gyeongsangnam-do
This is a list of waterfalls in Gyeongsangnam-do
 Jangyoo Waterfall
 Mundong Waterfall
 Mujigae Waterfall
 Hongnyong Waterfall
 Bulil Waterfall
 Guman Waterfall
 Hwanggye Waterfall
 Suwol Waterfall
 Yongchu Waterfall
 Seonyudong Waterfall

Ulsan Metropolitan City
This is a list of waterfalls in Ulsan Metropolitan City
 Paraeso Waterfall
 Hongryu Waterfall

Jeollabuk-do
This is a list of waterfalls in Jeollabuk-do
 Jikso Waterfall
 Wibong Waterfall
 Guryoung Waterfall
 Chunil Waterfall

Jeollanam-do
This is a list of waterfalls in Jeollabnam-do
 Surak Waterfall
 Manyeon Waterfall
 Yongchu Waterfall
 Guam Waterfall
 Sapyung Waterfall

Chungcheongbuk-do
This is a list of waterfalls in Chungcheongbuk-do
 Suok Waterfall
 Okgae Waterfall
 Yongchu Waterfall
 Suryoung Waterfall
 Yongdam Waterfall

Chungcheongnam-do
This is a list of waterfalls in Chungcheongbnam-do
 Sipyi Waterfall
 Eunsun Waterfall
 Gunji Waterfall

References

Waterfalls
South Korea